Bonnell may refer to:

 Bonnell (name)
 Bonnell, Indiana, United States
 Mount Bonnell, a prominent point alongside Lake Austin in Austin, Texas
 Bonnell (microarchitecture), used in Intel Atom processors

See also
 Bonel
 Bonnel
 Bunnell (disambiguation)